The first season of Marie, an American talk show, began October 1, 2012, is being released on DVD on November 1, 2013 by Sony Pictures Home Entertainment and airs on The Hallmark Channel.

Episodes

References

General references

External links
 

Lists of American non-fiction television series episodes